The Finnish Women's Curling Championship is the national championship of women's curling in Finland. It has been held annually since 1994. From 1994 until 1998 it was known as the Finnish Cup. Since 1999 the Finnish championship team has been determined by the winning team of the Finnish Women's Championships league.

List of champions

References

See also
Finnish Men's Curling Championship
Finnish Mixed Curling Championship
Finnish Mixed Doubles Curling Championship
Finnish Wheelchair Curling Championship
Finnish Junior Curling Championships